Replikins are a group of peptides, whose increase in concentration in virus or other organism proteins is associated with rapid replication. It is often measured in number of replikins per 100 amino acids. This particular group of peptides have been found to play a significant role in predicting both infectivity and lethality of various viral strains. In particular, this group allowed the prediction of the A/H1N1 pandemic almost one year before onset.

A method for identifying replikins was patented by Samuel and Elenore S. Bogoch in 2001. The peptide group was first identified by a proprietary company called Replikins, who have trademarked the name "Replikin Count".

See also
2009 flu pandemic

References

External links
Replikins web site
Peptide Pros

Peptides